Helmet is a 2021 Indian Hindi-language comedy film with a strong message of contraceptive awareness directed by Satram Ramani and produced by Sony Pictures Films India and Dino Morea. It features Aparshakti Khurana, Pranutan Bahl, Abhishek Banerjee, Ashish Verma and Sharib Hashmi in lead roles. The film premiered on 3 September 2021 on ZEE5. It tries to change the taboo and hesitancy associated with use of condoms in India.

Plot 
Lucky and Rupali are very much in love and want to get married but her father objects as Lucky is an orphan and has less income then the boy he has chosen for Rupali.Lucky wants to start his own band and tries to get loan but Rupali's father and uncle are so powerful that they warn everyone not to help him.Lucky comes up with an idea of looting a truck containing electronic goods an involves his two friends Sultan and Minus.Lucky ,Sultan and Minus loot the truck but find that are no electronic goods but condoms inside. The trio then has no option but to sell the condoms in a different way by wearing a helmet so nobody identifies them.

Cast 

 Aparshakti Khurana as Lucky
 Pranutan Bahl as Rupali
 Abhishek Banerjee as Sultan
 Ashish Verma as Minus
 Ashish Vidyarthi as Jogi, Rupali's father
 Sharib Hashmi as Bunty Bhai
 Saanand Verma as Shambhu, medical shop owner
 Shrikant Varma as Gupta, Band Owner 
 Dino Morea as Biker, Cameo appearance

Production 
The Principal photography commenced on 19 December 2019 in Varanasi. The film was wrapped up on 20 January 2020.

Soundtrack 

The music of film was composed by Tanishk-Vayu, Tony Kakkar, JAM8 and Nirmaan while lyrics written by Vayu, Tony Kakkar, Shloke Lal and Nirmaan.

Reception
Rahul Desai of Film Companion wrote, "The biggest irony of Helmet is that India's condom commercials over the years have been far more imaginative, cheekier and...slicker."

References

External links 
 Helmet at ZEE5
 

2021 films
2021 comedy films
Indian comedy films
2020s Hindi-language films
Sony Pictures films
Columbia Pictures films
Sony Pictures Networks India films
Films scored by JAM8
Films scored by Tanishk-Vayu
Films scored by Tanishk Bagchi
Films scored by Tony Kakkar